The Mizoram Super League is the highest state-level basketball league in Mizoram, India.  The competition is conducted by the Mizoram Basketball Association. The league started in 2015.

Media coverage

Media coverage is with Zonet Cable TV. The deal was signed by Mizoram Basketball Association president Chalrosanga, while Zonet Cable TV Director Vanneihtluanga signed for Zonet.

Structure
Mizoram Super League most often has up to eight teams. At the end of the season the bottom players are relegated and the top team from First Division are promoted into MSL.

The clubs playing in 2022 are: 

Chawnpui BC
Khatla TBL 
Tuikual South BC  
Mission Veng Hotshots 
Chanmari Vikings
BCA Zarkawt

Venue
The main venue where the matches are held is Hawla Indoor Stadium.

See also
UBA Pro Basketball League
Basketball Federation of India

References

Sport in Mizoram
 Organisations based in Mizoram
2015 establishments in Mizoram
Sports organizations established in 2015